In 2002, the Institute of Electrical and Electronics Engineers (IEEE) added a new award to its already existing program of awards. Each year, one or more nominees are honored with a medal in the name of Jun-ichi Nishizawa, considered to be the father of Japanese microelectronics. Nishizawa was professor, director of two research institutes and the 17th president at Tohoku University, Sendai, Japan, and contributed important innovations in the fields of optical communications and semiconductor devices, such as laser and PIN diodes and static induction thyristors for electric power applications.

This medal is awarded by the IEEE on a yearly basis to nominees in the fields of materials science and device technologies.

Sponsor of this award is the Federation of Electric Power Companies, Japan.

Recipients 
The following have won the award:

References

External links 
 IEEE Jun-ichi Nishizawa Medal

Awards established in 2002
Jun-ichi Nishizawa Medal
2002 establishments in the United States